Petr Kadlec (born 5 January 1977 in Prague) is a Czech professional ice hockey defenceman who currently plays for HC Slavia Praha of the Czech Extraliga. Kadlec was drafted 234th overall in the 2003 NHL Entry Draft by the Florida Panthers, but has played his entire career within his native Czech Republic.

Kadlec previously played in each of his 19 professional seasons with HC Slavia Praha of the Czech Extraliga. After brief loan spells with HC Berounští Medvědi and HC Keramika Plzeň, Kadlec opted to endure his first full professional season away from Prague in signing a one-year deal with HC Keramika Plzeň for his 20th professional season on 2 May 2014.

Career statistics

Regular season and playoffs

International

References

External links 
 

1977 births
Living people
Czech ice hockey defencemen
Florida Panthers draft picks
HC Berounští Medvědi players
HC Plzeň players
HC Slavia Praha players
Ice hockey people from Prague